The gates of Baghdad refers to the several bab, meaning gate in Arabic, connected by walls surrounding the city of Baghdad. The gates and the walls were designed to protect the city from foreign incursions. Some of the components date back to the Abbasid era, while others were preserved and renovated during the Ottoman era.

History

The Round city of Baghdad was constructed by the Abbasid Caliph Abu Ja’far al-Mansur during 762–768, surrounded by enclosures with four gates, namely Bab al-Kufa ("gate of Kufa"), Bab al-Sham ("gate of al-Sham or Damascus"), Bab al-Khorasan ("gate of Khorasan"), and Bab al-Basra ("gate of Basra"). However, these four gates were eventually destroyed. Today the area is the neighborhood of Karkh in Mansour district, which located in southwest Baghdad.

During the late Abbasid era, the 28th caliph, al-Mustazhir, laid out a plan to expand the enclosure with additional walls, gates, moats and obstructions against invaders. The expansion plan was carried out during the reign of the succeeding Caliph al-Mustarshid, and additional four gates were constructed, namely Bab al-Muadham, Bab ash-Sharqi, Bab al-Talsim and Bab al-Wastani. These four gates remained long after the fall of the Abbasid Caliphate.

Gates

Main gates 

Bab al-Muadham, also known as Bab al-Sultan, was located at the beginning of the Al-Muadi Street nearby the Abu Hanifa Mosque in Adhamiyah district. The remains of the gate no longer exist as they were demolished after the Allied capture of Baghdad. Today the surrounding area is referred by its name, where is considered as one of the centers of Baghdad. 
Bab ash-Sharqi was located in ash-Sharqi quarter of the old Baghdad at the end of the Al Rasheed Street. The origin of the gate is the gates of Baghdad during the Ottoman era. The gate was turned into a church after the Allied capture in 1917 and later demolished in 1937.

Bab Al-Talsim, also known as Bab al-Halba or Talisman Gate, was built in 1220. The gate was demolished by the Ottoman troops in 1917 during their withdrawal from Baghdad, in order to prevent it from being turned into a warehouse by the advancing Allied forces.
Bab al-Wastani, also known as Bab Khorasan, is the only remaining gate today. The gate is known for situated nearby the Mausoleum of Umar Suhrawardi. During the late 20th century, the site was restored which can be overlooked from the Muhammad al-Qassim Highway. At the same time, the surrounding graves and mosques which date back to Abbasid era, known as Al-Wardiyya Cemetery, were uprooted in order to build the infrastructure for tourism surrounding the gate.

Other gates
Bab al-Aga was located in today's Bab al-Aga neighborhood.
Bab ash-Shaykh (abbreviation of Ash-Shaykh Abdul-Qadir al-Kilani) is a gate located in today's Bab al-Sharqi neighborhood.

References

Abbasid architecture
Buildings and structures in Baghdad
Demolished buildings and structures in Iraq
Fortifications in Iraq
Baghdad
Historic sites in Iraq
Baghdad under the Abbasid Caliphate